Elections to Birmingham City Council in England were held in May 2007. One third of the council was up for election and the council stayed under no overall control as it had been since 2003.

Election result

Ward results

Acocks Green

Aston

Bartley Green

Billesley

Bordesley Green

Bournville

Brandwood

Edgbaston

Erdington

Hall Green

Handsworth Wood

Harborne

Hodge Hill

Kings Norton

Kingstanding

Ladywood

Longbridge

Lozells and East Handsworth

Moseley and Kings Heath

Nechells

Northfield

Oscott

Perry Barr

Quinton

Selly Oak

Shard End

Sheldon

Soho

South Yardley

Sparkbrook

Springfield

Stechford and Yardley North

Stockland Green

Sutton Four Oaks

Sutton New Hall

Sutton Trinity

Sutton Vesey

Tyburn

Washwood Heath

Weoley

References

Birmingham City Council election service (with links to results)
2007 Birmingham Council election (BBC)

2007
2007 English local elections
2000s in Birmingham, West Midlands